Importin-11 is a protein that in humans is encoded by the IPO11 gene.

References

Further reading